Bocchit Edmond is a Haitian politician and diplomat. He has been the ambassador of Haiti to the United States since December 1, 2020, when he replaced Hervé Denis, the prior ambassador. In 2022 he called for military intervention from the international community to stem unrest and violence.

Previously, Edmond served as Haiti's Minister of Foreign Affairs from September 2018 until March 2020, when he was succeeded by Claude Joseph.

References 

Living people
Foreign Ministers of Haiti
Ambassadors of Haiti to the United States
Haitian diplomats
Year of birth missing (living people)